The term "high-Z" is used to refer to:

Chemical elements with a high atomic number (Z) of protons in the nucleus
A high impedance electronic signal.
Stars with a high redshift (Z)
The High-Z Supernova Search Team
These materials are like Lead which are used for Radiation shield.